Ameloblastella is a genus of monogeneans belonging to the family Ancyrocephalidae.
All members of the genus are parasitic on fish.

Species
The following species are considered valid according to WorRMS: 

 Ameloblastella chavarriai (Price, 1938) Kritsky, Mendoza-Franco & Scholz, 2000
 Ameloblastella edentensis Mendoza-Franco, Mendoza-Palmero & Scholz, 2016 
 Ameloblastella formatrium Mendoza-Franco, Mendoza-Palmero & Scholz, 2016 
 Ameloblastella peruensis Mendoza-Franco, Mendoza-Palmero & Scholz, 2016 
 Ameloblastella unapioides Mendoza-Franco, Mendoza-Palmero & Scholz, 2016

References

Ancyrocephalidae
Monogenea genera